Kabaret: Live au Casino de Paris is a home video/live album by French singer Patricia Kaas. It was released on DVD in France on 18 May 2009. Later, on 25 September 2009 it was issued as a two-disc CD/DVD set in Germany. The video/album was recorded in January 2009 during the concerts at the Casino de Paris, which promoted Kabaret (2008). Kabaret: Live au Casino de Paris includes songs from Kabaret, and also Kaas previous hits. The DVD debuted and peaked at number two on the French DVD Chart, only behind Celine Dion's Live à Quebec.

Track listing

Charts

Weekly charts

Year-end charts

Release history

References 

Patricia Kaas albums
2009 live albums
2009 video albums
Live video albums